Française is a 2008 film.

Synopsis 
Sofia, born in France of North African parents, lives a happy childhood in a French suburban city. Her father, feeling homesick, decides to take all the family back to Morocco. Sofia suddenly finds herself on a Moroccan farm. She is just ten years old and swears she will pass all her exams with flying notes to be able to go back to France when she is eighteen. But life is full of surprises…

Awards 
 Rotterdam International Film Festival (2009)
 Dubai International Film Festival (2008)

External links 

 

2008 films
French drama films
Moroccan drama films
2000s French films